Alice Isn't Dead is a podcast presented as a series of audio diaries by a truck driver in her search across America for the wife she had long assumed was dead (the eponymous Alice). In the course of her search, she encounters not-quite-human serial murderers, towns literally lost in time, and a conspiracy that goes way beyond her missing wife. The series was created in 2016 by Joseph Fink, and it has been published by Night Vale Presents since March 8, 2016. The main character and narrator, whose name is only mentioned as being Keisha on the last episode of the first season, is voiced by Jasika Nicole. During its run, the podcast typically aired on alternating Tuesdays. The first season ended on July 12, 2016, with a second season premiering on April 4, 2017 which concluded on August 8th, 2017. Fink stated that the third season would be the final season; it began airing on April 24, 2018, and concluded in August, 2018.

A novel based on the series, written by Fink, was released on October 30, 2018 by Harper Perennial.

Production
In an interview with the Huffington Post, Joseph Fink explained that the inspiration for the podcast came from his experiences traveling around in vans on long trips, particularly in the United States, for the Welcome to Night Vale live shows. The series puts particular focus on the narrator driving through towns without stopping and spending time at rest stops along the highway. All ten episodes of the first season were written by Fink, with music by Disparition.

Jasika Nicole also appears on Welcome to Night Vale in the role of Dana Cardinal. She was pitched Alice Isn't Dead during a conversation with Fink before one of the Night Vale live shows and signed on immediately, receiving scripts a few months later. The first season was partially funded through sponsored advertising by Audible Inc., Squarespace, Casper Sleep, and Blue Apron - a practice that would continue with other series under the Night Vale Presents banner such as Within the Wires and The Orbiting Human Circus (of the Air).

Roberta Colindrez, who appeared in the original cast of Fun Home and was a member of the Neo-Futurists alongside much of the Night Vale Presents crew, makes an uncredited voice cameo in the finale of Part 1. She makes her first credited appearance as this character in the bonus episode "Haugen, Montana," narrating in place of Jasika Nicole, before making an appearance in the premiere of Part 2. Erica Livingston, also a former Neo-Futurist, makes an uncredited voice cameo as the titular Alice in the finale of Part 2, before making her first credited appearance as the character narrating the bonus episode "Mérida, Yucatán."

List of episodes

Series overview

Part 1 (2016)

Part 2 (2017)

Part 3 (2018)

Bonus episodes 
During the lead ups to the releases of Part 2 and Part 3, short bonus episodes were released to advertise the podcast's return.

Part 2 (2017)

Part 3 (2018) 

Another live show, entitled "The Finish Line," was be performed at Live at the Coronet in Los Angeles on April 27, 2019, and was released digitally on November 14, 2019.

Patreon-exclusive
As part of the Patreon campaign for Part 3, several bonus episodes were released to patrons of the show. On October 14, 2019, the first four Patreon exclusive episodes were released publicly as a compilation episode called "The Window & The Mirror."

Reception

Cassandra Khaw of Ars Technica positively reviewed the first three episodes, stating that the series "very quickly comes into its own, dropping any pretence of gallows humour for the kind of creeping, consuming terror that pervades the best horror movies." Neil Verma compared the modus operandi of the Thistle Man, the series' antagonist who follows its narrator as she drives across America, to that of the eponymous villain in Lucille Fletcher's 1941 radio play The Hitch-Hiker.

Awards

TV adaptation 
A television adaptation of the podcast was in development for USA Network by Universal Cable Productions. The series would have been written and executive produced by Kyle Bradstreet, who would have served as showrunner. Fink would have written for and executive produced the show. The show was ultimately not picked up.

See also 

 Horror podcast

References

2016 podcast debuts
2018 podcast endings
American podcasts
Audio podcasts
Horror podcasts
LGBT-related podcasts
Podcasts adapted for other media
Scripted podcasts
Night Vale Presents

External links